Yangulam is a Rai Coast language spoken in Madang Province, Papua New Guinea.

References

External links 
 Paradisec has an open access collection that includes Yangulam language materials from Don Daniels

Rai Coast languages
Languages of Madang Province